Gert Olesk (born 8 August 1973) is an Estonian football coach and former professional player. He played the position of defender.

International career
Olesk has made a total of 13 appearances for the Estonia national team. He made his international debut in 1994.

Managerial career
Olesk was the head coach of Pärnu Linnameeskond and led the team to Estonian top-tier Meistriliiga.

He has worked for Pärnu JK as assistant coach and youth coach.

In November 2022, Olesk was appointed the head coach of Pärnu JK.

References

External links

Living people
1973 births
Sportspeople from Pärnu
Estonian footballers
Estonia international footballers
Viljandi JK Tulevik players
FC Flora players
Pärnu JK Vaprus players
FC Elva players
Estonian football managers
Association football defenders
JK Tervis Pärnu players
Pärnu JK Vaprus managers